Leadfoot: Stadium Off-Road Racing, or Leadfoot for short, is a computer video game by the now defunct Ratbag Games. It is a spin-off of the dirt track racing series by Ratbag, which includes Dirt Track Racing, Dirt Track Racing: Sprint Cars and Dirt Track Racing 2. It is a racing game simulation reproducing the sport of stadium off-road racing. Pick-up trucks and buggies race around dirt tracks built inside stadiums - Supercross on four wheels.

Movie Maker
Software included in Leadfoot allows for the exporting of video clips of game action in AVI format.

Race vehicles
Players can choose from 8 different vehicles, in 2 classes.

Reception

The game received "average" reviews according to the review aggregation website Metacritic.

Computer Games Magazine nominated the game as the best racing game of 2001, but ultimately gave the award to NASCAR Racing 4.

References

External links
Ratbag Games Last version of Ratbag Games official website reproduced by Australian video game website Sumea for archives purposes.

2001 video games
Multiplayer and single-player video games
North America-exclusive video games
Racing video games
Video games developed in Australia
Windows games
Windows-only games
Take-Two Interactive games
WizardWorks games